Máté Lékai (born 16 June 1988) is a Hungarian handball player for Ferencvárosi TC and the Hungarian national team.

His first major international tournament was the 2011 World Championship, where Hungary finished seventh. He finished fourth with the national team at the 2012 Summer Olympics.

He is the son of former high jumper Olga Juha.

Honours

Club
PLER KC
Magyar Kupa
 : 2007

Pick Szeged
Nemzeti Bajnokság I
 : 2011, 2012
Magyar Kupa
 : 2012

RK Celje
Slovenian First League
 : 2014
 : 2013
Slovenian Cup
 : 2013, 2014
Slovenian Supercup
 : 2014

MKB Veszprém KC
EHF Champions League :
 : 2015, 2016, 2019
SEHA League:
 : 2015, 2016, 2020, 2021
 : 2017
Nemzeti Bajnokság I
 : 2015, 2016, 2017, 2019
 : 2018, 2021, 2022
Magyar Kupa
 : 2015, 2016, 2017, 2018, 2021, 2022
 : 2019

Individual
"Teenager's Player of the Year": 2005
 Hungarian Junior Handballer of the Year: 2009
 Silver Cross of the Cross of Merit of the Republic of Hungary (2012)
Junior Príma díj (2012)
 Hungarian Handballer of the Year: 2017

References

External links

Máté Lékai player profile
Máté Lékai career statistics at Worldhandball

1988 births
Living people
Hungarian male handball players
Handball players from Budapest
Handball players at the 2012 Summer Olympics
Olympic handball players of Hungary
Expatriate handball players
Hungarian expatriate sportspeople in Slovenia
Veszprém KC players
SC Pick Szeged players